Trijntje Cornelisdochter Keever (10 or 16 April 1616 – 2 July 1633), nicknamed De Groote Meid (in English, The Big Girl), is alleged to be the tallest female person in recorded history, standing 9 Amsterdam feet or  tall at the time of her death at age seventeen.

Trijntje Keever was the daughter of Cornelis Keever and Anna Pouwels. Cornelis was a Dutch skipper and Anna was his maid; he married her on May 24, 1605. Trijntje was born on April 10 or 16, 1616, in Edam.

Keever's parents took her to carnivals to earn some money by letting people see her. A royal company consisting of the Bohemian king Frederick V, Elector Palatine, his wife Elizabeth of Bohemia and the princess Amalia of Solms-Braunfels, living in The Hague at the time, visited her, curious about the "nine-year-old girl taller than every man in Europe".

Keever died of cancer at the age of 17 in Ter Veen. She was buried on 7 July 1633 in Edam, her town of birth. Her epitaph is said to have read, or, in English: “Trijntje Crelis, big girl, 17 years of age”. In the townhall of Edam is a lifesize painting by an unknown artist portraying Keever in civilian clothes with a belt holding at her right a keyring and at her left a pincushion and a sheath with a knife, fork, and spoon. The caption with the painting suggests she was portrayed more beautiful than she really was and that she probably had gigantism.

Her original shoes are also on display.

Despite her height compared to Zeng Jinlian her height remains unverified by many sources,  but she is considered by many as the tallest woman in reported history and seventh-tallest person ever, behind Robert Wadlow, John Rogan, John F. Carroll,
Franz Winkelmeier, Leonid Stadnyk, Vikas Uppal and Julius Koch. She was the tallest person ever until Franz Winkelmeier.

See also 
 List of tallest people
 Robert Wadlow, the tallest recorded person

References

External links 
Digitaal Vrouwenlexicon – portret, in Dutch

1616 births
1633 deaths
People from Edam-Volendam
People with gigantism
Deaths from cancer in the Netherlands
Burials in the Netherlands
17th-century Dutch women
Ethnological show business